Peter Morcom (9 November 1923 – 12 December 2007) was an  Australian rules footballer who played with St Kilda in the Victorian Football League (VFL).

Notes

External links 

1923 births
2007 deaths
Australian rules footballers from Victoria (Australia)
St Kilda Football Club players
People educated at Caulfield Grammar School